Scopula sarcodes is a moth of the  family Geometridae. It is found in South Africa.

References

Endemic moths of South Africa
Moths described in 1935
Taxa named by Louis Beethoven Prout
sarcodes
Moths of Africa